Linky Boshoff and Ilana Kloss retained their title by defeating Mary Carillo and Wendy Overton in the final.

Draw

References

U.S. Clay Court Championships
1977 U.S. Clay Court Championships